The Parwan Campaign took place from October-November 1840, as a result of Dost Mohammad Khan's rebellion against Shah Shuja and the British backed regime. The Parwan campaign had over 13 different clashes, and ended in an Afghan victory, with Robert Sale forced to abandon the campaign and return to Kabul.

Background
In 1839, the British invaded Afghanistan to restore Shah Shuja Durrani, a former ruler of Durrani descent. The British wished to restore Shah Shuja to the throne as a puppet and to counter-act growing Russian influence in the region. The British successfully invaded and forced Dost Mohammad Khan to flee from Kabul, which prompted in him leading to a growing insurgency with the Mir Wali of Khulm in northern Afghanistan.

The Defeat at Saighan and Mir Wali's treaty with Shah Shuja made Dost Mohammad abandon his attempts of trying to raise an army in Balkh, and instead found allies elsewhere, where he allied with the leaders of the Kohistan rebellion that had tried to depose him prior, from Sultan Muhammad Khan of Nijrab and Mir Hajji. After a year of British occupation, they realized their mistake of opposition toward Dost Mohammad, and now called for his restoration, seeking to support him. Mostly disappointed by the lack of reward Shah Shuja gave them, as well as poor rule from Shah Shuja's regime led to this. Shah Shuja even lowered their allowances and demanded several years of payment of revenue. Adding to the tension that was already there, Shah Shuja also forcefully conscripted hundreds of Kohistanis and Safis into his army.

Mir Hajji and other religious leaders refused to also pay a tax imposed by Shah Shuja, claiming it was against shari’a and unlawful for the ruler to impose such. When they came to Kabul to discuss the issue with Shah Shuja, he refused to allow them to leave, and shortly after the victory at Saighan, they were imprisoned. The Shah imprisoned Hafizji and other religious leaders. Following the arrests, Mir Hajji and Hafizji denounced Shah Shuja as a “Kafir”, and legitimized a Jihad against him and the British. By the end of September 1840, the regions of Kohistan, Tagab, and Nijrab were in revolt, posing a serious threat to Shah Shuja's regime, as these areas could mobilize up to 50,000 men.

With only two British-Indian regiments left in Kabul to defend the city, as well as the Shah's army deemed unfit, Dennie was recalled from Bamiyan. As a result, Shah Shuja's kingdom's most northern outpost was now Old Charikar in the Koh Daman. News of the uprising in Kohistan struck fear in the capital, with shopkeepers closing their shops, burying their jewels and other treasure, and sending family to scatter across the countryside. Realizing that action had to be taken, General Cotton called upon Robert Sale, a veteran of the Anglo-Burmese war.

Robert Sale was tasked with ending the rebellion, and while planning, he was accompanied by one of Shah Shuja's sons, Timur Mirza. Sale began his first campaign and immediately faced harsh resistance, where in his first battle at Tutam Darra, Lieutenant Edward Connolly, Arthur Connolly's brother, was shot through the heart, however the fort was retaken from rebels. Sale's next objective was the stronghold of Jalgah, governed by Mir Masjidi. When Sale's men attempted to storm the walls of Jalgah, they were repelled with heavy casualties. This was as a result of Sale's scaling ladders brought from Kabul being too short to properly scale the walls of the stronghold. Even worse for him, Sale did not bring any heavy siege weaponry, however, fortunately for Sale, Mir Masjidi was wounded among the fighting upon his first attempt at storming, as a result, he abandoned the stronghold. The following morning, Sale marched into the stronghold, ordering it and its crops, orchards, and vineyards to be razed and burned. Yet Sale's storming of the stronghold was rather unneeded, as prior to the assault, Ghulam Khan had secured Mir Masjidi's allegiance, alongside Mir Hajji and Khoja Abd’al-Khaliq. This was due to the fact that they did not owe allegiance to Dost Mohammad, in-fact, they were indebted to the Sadozai dynasty who had helped bring them to rule in the region under Zaman Shah Durrani. And now, having heard of Sale's attack on Jalgah, Mir Masjidi accused Ghulam Khan and the British of perfidy, fully defecting to Dost Mohammad's side alongside a group of pirs.

In early October 1840, Dost Mohammad arrived in Nijrab to command his army. In over 13 different skirmishes and clashes, the British were defeated and unable to halt the Afghan resistance. Nonetheless, Sale, seeking to force an open battle with Dost Mohammad, moved across the Panjshir, razing many local villages and their crops, orchards, and vineyards. At the same time, Sale overstretched his line of communication, and supply lines. When Sale reached the village of Kah Darra, the rebels abandoned it after brief fighting, to which, many local village leaders and elders came to Sale to show their allegiance. Despite this, Sale ordered the burning of Kah Darra's 800 houses, razing the entire village alongside its crops, vineyards, and orchards. This action of brutality that was meant to inspire dread and fear however, backfired, as Saif-al-din's nephew, who was the leader of a Kohistani regiment under Shah Shuja was brought the news, he defected with a large amount of men, including nearly all the Durrani Cavalry.

Battle
On 2 November 1840, Dost Mohammad finally confronted Sale's forces, halting his advance and engaging battle at Parwan Darra. Dost Mohammad held a strong defensive position with over 400 cavalrymen, with his forces dug in on a ridge overlooking Sale's advance. Sale sent Captain Fraser and his Bengal horse force to attack the enemy infantry, however, only a handful of men followed the order, leaving the British officers to charge against the Afghan force alone and essentially without any support. Dr Lord, earlier political officer of Bamiyan who offered Dost Mohammad terms of surrender was killed amongst this fighting that broke out. According to Dalrymple, Lord led a cavalry charge which was too late to realize that the rest of the force fled from the field. Fortunately, Fraser survived this charge and returned to British lines, however, with his sabre nearly severed at the wrist.

Dost Mohammad, seeing what had happened ordered his cavalry to lead a counter-attack, whereupon the disorganized Bengal horse force was routed, with the Afghan Cavalry chasing them in pursuit and killing many. According to the depictions of Jonathan Lee, the 2nd Bengal Horse was disgraced for their inability to follow orders, later disbanded, and erased from records. Nonetheless, following this route, Sale ordered his infantry and Qizilbash to storm the heights, and after heavy fighting and heavy casualties, they secured the ridge, to their dismay where they saw Dost Mohammad withdraw his forces in good order. Both sides withdrew, and later, the Afghans re-occupied the ridge, which was left undefended. With the ridge position, they fired onto the British camp below. As the following day came, Timur Mirza and Burnes urged Sale to abandon the campaign. This was due to the Afghan troops loyal to Shah Shuja who had not deserted, already being on the edge of mutiny, as well as Sale losing hundreds of men and many more wounded with nothing to show for it. With supplies running low as well, he obliged and returned to Charikar, crossing the Panjshir river, with those villages he had campaigned for at great cost quickly being reoccupied.

Aftermath

Despite Sale having little to show for the campaign and the trail of devastation left by him, Sale called Parwan Darra a victory. However he was unable to conceal the fact of the 2nd Bengal horse defying orders, and as a result, many British officers were killed. Atkinson, the armies surgeon general, called the encounter a “disaster”, Kaye also called the battle a defeat. However, early in the evening of 2 November 1840, a horsemen identified as Sultan Muhammad Khan Safi rode up to Macnaghten, as with this, he was followed by another lone horsemen, who came up to Macnaghten. This horsemen was no other then Dost Mohammad Khan.

Despite his victory at the battle of Parwan Darra, Dost Mohammad surrendered due to rising plots of assassination against him by his Kohistani allies.
After his surrender, he would be exiled to British India. However, following his exile, he would return to rule after his son, Wazir Akbar Khan led an active resistance that saw British withdrawal in 1842.

References

See also 

 First Anglo-Afghan War
 Dost Mohammad Khan
 Sher Ali Khan

1840s in Afghanistan
First Anglo-Afghan War
01
Anglo-Afghan War 01
19th-century military history of the United Kingdom
1840 in Asia